David Robert Aitcheson (born 1964) is a Fijian international male lawn bowler.

Biography

Commonwealth Games
Aitcheson represented Fiji at the 2018 Commonwealth Games. In 2022, he competed in the men's triples and the men's fours at the 2022 Commonwealth Games.

World Championships
In 2020 he was selected for the 2020 World Outdoor Bowls Championship in Australia.

Asia Pacific Championships
He won a triples bronze medal with Arun Kumar and Waisea Turaga at the 2015 Asia Pacific Bowls Championships in New Zealand.

References

Living people
1964 births
Fijian male bowls players
Bowls players at the 2018 Commonwealth Games
Bowls players at the 2022 Commonwealth Games
Commonwealth Games competitors for Fiji
People from Labasa